Power of Faerûn is a supplement to the 3.5 edition of the Dungeons & Dragons role-playing game.

Contents
Power of Faerûn is an accessory for the Forgotten Realms which gives players suggested tactics, and descriptions.of possible pitfalls and opportunities, for guiding their player characters into dominance in a campaign set in Faerûn. The book includes adventure ideas and guidelines for detailing ruling courts and other institutions and power groups as well as handling political struggles, crises, and daily situations in play.

Publication history
Power of Faerûn was written by Ed Greenwood and Eric L. Boyd, and published in March 2006. Cover art was by Lucio Parrillo, with interior art by Daarken, Eric Deschamps, Rick Drennan, Ron Lemen, Warren Mahy, William O'Connor, Lucio Parrillo, Francis Tsai, and Franz Vohwinkel.

Ed Greenwood explained that his incentives for working on this book involved "the chance to delve into some of the hitherto-neglected facets of running high-level campaigns, including trade, intrigue, and social matters, and the opportunity to tackle the project alongside Eric L. Boyd, who's a great friend, superb 3.5e designer, and top-notch Realms expert".

Reception

References

Forgotten Realms sourcebooks
Role-playing game supplements introduced in 2006